Jack Oliver Cooper (born February 1980) is an English singer, composer and guitarist. Currently a member of Modern Nature, Cooper was previously a member of The Beep Seals, Mazes and Ultimate Painting.

Biography

Cooper was born in Blackpool, and re-located to Manchester in the early 2000s. In 2003, he signed to Twisted Nerve Records and released the song Hope I Don't Cry on a 7" single with 2 other artists which was issued as part of the label's mail order single subscription service. I

However, instead of continuing to pursue a solo career Cooper served as part of Noir's backing band along with former Alfie guitarist Ian Smith on drums. The musicians dubbed themselves The Beep Seals and helped Noir record and tour his debut album Tower of Love, which was released in December 2005. Following tour commitments, the band parted ways with Jim Noir and began working on their own material with Cooper and Smith co-fronting. Through 2007, the band released 2 singles in the form of Tell Your Friends and Stars. In 2018, the band released their debut album Things That Roar, which was produced by Teenage Fanclub frontman Norman Blake. 

In 2009, Cooper formed Mazes. Initially conceived as a solo project following the split of the Beep Seals, after some early lineup changes the band lineup was completed by bassist Neil Robinson and drummer Conan Roberts. The band went on to release 3 albums proper; A Thousand Heys in 2011, Ores & Minerals in 2013 and Wooden Aquarium in 2014. 

Following the quiet disbandment of Mazes in 2014, Cooper moved on to work with former Veronica Falls member James Hoare and formed Ultimate Painting. The band signed to US record label Trouble in Mind and released 3 albums in quick succession; Ultimate Painting in 2014, Green Lanes in 2015 and Dusk in 2016. Commenting on the productivity of the band, Cooper commented that "after we made the first record I knew that this is something we’d be doing for a while but to do three records in three years does feel like an achievement. Being completely honest, it’s not always easy. We’re two very different people and we disagree about even the tiniest thing". In August 2017, Cooper released his debut solo album Sandgrown via Trouble in Mind, influenced by his childhood in Blackpool.

In January 2018, Ultimate Painting announced that their fourth album Up was set for release in the following April via Bella Union and shared lead-single Not Gonna Burn Myself Anymore. A UK tour to coincide with the release was announced and put on sale. On 12 February 2018, Jack Cooper announced that the band were splitting up, adding that "the partnership at the core of this band has always been a very fragile thing, but due to an irreconcilable breakdown we will no longer be working with each other". The previously announced album release was cancelled at Cooper's express request and the UK tour to support it was also cancelled.

In February 2019, Cooper unveiled his new band Modern Nature, announcing their debut EP Nature which was released in March via Bella Union. Commenting on the lineup of the band, Cooper revealed that "the band is so new, it's hard to say who's in and who isn't. At the moment it's myself and Will Young (Beak>), with Aaron Neveu on drums (Woods/Herbcraft), Rupert Gillett on cello and then Jeff Tobias on saxophone". Young also previously played live with Ultimate Painting, and Tobias is a member of US band Sunwatchers

During the early months of the 2020 pandemic, Cooper and Modern Nature's collaborators launched a sprawling improvisation project called Cycles which was followed by a mini-album Annual which built on the jazz influenced direction explored on a series of self released improvisation cassettes featuring Cooper and collaborator Jeff Tobias.

In the summer of 2021, Cooper and collaborator Jeff Tobias released an album of Cooper's composed music called 'Tributaries' on the American jazz label Astral Spirits. The album received plaudits, particularly Downbeat magazine who described it as "conversational, neither overly composed nor overly improvisational. The systems within feel as if they could go on forever in an infinite loop. Tributaries uses space and pacing to good effect throughout. Tobias plays the perfect foil to Cooper’s guitar playing, highlighting the compositions without overpowering Cooper’s guitar. Cooper describes the aim as “melodic collectivism” and Tributaries gets there."

In 2021, Modern Nature released an ambitious project called 'Island Of Noise' which incorporated a second LP called 'Island Of Silence' and a book with contributors such as Merlin Sheldrake and Booker nominated poet Robin Robertson. The album was met with universal acclaim.

Discography

The Beep Seals

2008 - Things That Roar - Heron Recordings

Mazes
2011 - A Thousand Heys - FatCat Records
2011 - IBB Tape - Italian Beach Babes
2013 - Ores & Minerals - FatCat Records
2013 - Better Ghosts - Fat Cat Records
2014 - Wooden Aquarium - FatCat Records

Ultimate Painting
 2014 - Ultimate Painting - Trouble in Mind
 2015 - Green Lanes - Trouble in Mind
 2015 - Live At Third Man Records - Third Man
 2016 - Dusk - Trouble in Mind
 2018 - Up! - Bella Union

Solo
 2004 - Turn The Light Off EP - My Dad Recordings
 2017 - Sandgrown - Trouble in Mind
2021 - Tributaries (with Jeff Tobias) - Astral Spirits

Modern Nature
 2019 - Nature EP - Bella Union
 2019 - How To Live - Bella Union
 2020 - Annual - Bella Union
 2021 - Island Of Noise - Bella Union
 2021 - Island Of Silence - Bella Union

References

1980 births
Living people
English male guitarists
English male singers
English songwriters
21st-century English singers
21st-century British guitarists
21st-century British male singers
People from Blackpool
British male songwriters